During the 1990–91 English football season, AFC Bournemouth competed in the Football League Third Division.

Final league table

Results
Bournemouth's score comes first

Legend

Football League Third Division

FA Cup

League Cup

Football League Trophy

Squad

References

AFC Bournemouth seasons
AFC Bournemouth